Josu is a masculine given name which is mostly used in Spain. It is also used as a surname. Notable people with the name include:

Given name
Josu Agirre (born 1981), Spanish cyclist 
Josu Andueza (born 1973), Spanish rower
Josu Anuzita (born 1964), Spanish football player and manager
Josu Erkoreka (born 1963), Spanish politician 
Josu Esnaola (born 1986), Spanish football player
Josu Etxaniz (born 1985), Spanish football player
Josu Etxeberria (born 2000), Spanish cyclist
Josu Hernáez (born 1985), Spanish football player
Josu Iriondo (born 1938), Spanish-born American prelate of the Roman Catholic Church
Josu Jon Imaz (born 1963), Spanish Basque politician
Josu Larrazabal (born 1981), Spanish cyclist
Josu Muguruza (1958–1989), Spanish Basque journalist and politician 
Josu Ortuondo (born 1951), Spanish football player
Josu Ortuondo Larrea (born 1948), Spanish Basque politician 
Josu Sarriegi (born 1979), Spanish football player
Josu de Solaun Soto (born 1981), Spanish-American classical music pianist
Josu Uribe (born 1969), Spanish football manager
Josu Urrutia (born 1968), Spanish football player
Josu Urrutikoetxea (born 1950), Spanish Basque activist and politician
Josu Zabala (born 1993), Spanish cyclist

Surname
Nina Josu (born 1953), Moldovan writer and activist

See also
 Josu (born 1993), Josué Prieto Currais, Spanish football full-back

Basque masculine given names
Spanish masculine given names
Surnames of Moldovan origin